Neoi Poroi railway station is a railway station near the coastal village of Neoi Poroi, Thessaly, Greece. Opened on 7 September 2008. The station is served by both fast Regional trains and Proastiakos to Thessaloniki. Intercity services pass through the station but do not call at it.

History
The station opened on 7 September 2008 as part of the upgrades to the Piraeus–Platy Line. In 2009, with the Greek debt crisis unfolding OSE's Management was forced to reduce services across the network. Timetables were cut back and routes closed as the government-run entity attempted to reduce overheads. In 2017 OSE's passenger transport sector was privatised as TrainOSE, currently, a wholly owned subsidiary of Ferrovie dello Stato Italiane infrastructure, including stations, remained under the control of OSE.

Facilities
As of (2021) The station is staffed with a working ticket office. The station currently has three platforms; however, only two are currently in use. There are waiting rooms and toilets on platform one and waiting shelters on 2. Access to the platforms is via a raised walkway accessed by stairs or lifts. The platforms have shelters with seating; however, there are no Dot-matrix display departure and arrival screens or timetable poster boards on the platforms. The station, however, does have a small buffet. There is also Parking in the forecourt.

Services
It is served by regional stopping services to Thessaloniki, Kalambaka and Palaiofarsalos. Since 2008, it has been served by Proastiakos Thessaloniki to Larissa and Thessaloniki

In 2013 a new railway & bus interchange service began operations. Run by TrainOSE Bus The service allows passengers to transfer to a bus which departs for the beach for €1. The service operates every Friday, Saturday and Sunday, for the entire summer season.

See also
Railway stations in Greece
Hellenic Railways Organization
Hellenic Train
Proastiakos
P.A.Th.E./P.

References

Railway stations in Thessaly
Railway stations opened in 2008